The 2019 Southern Conference women's soccer tournament was the postseason women's soccer tournament for the Southern Conference held from October 30 through November 10, 2019. The first round and quarterfinals of the tournament were held at campus sites, while the semifinals and final took place at UNCG Soccer Stadium in Greensboro, North Carolina. The ten-team single-elimination tournament consisted of four rounds based on seeding from regular season conference play. The UNC Greensboro Spartans were the defending champions but were unable to defend their crown, losing 1–0 t the Furman Paladins in the semifinal.  The Samford Bulldogs were the eventual champions, defeating Furman 1–0 in the final. This was the third Southern Conference tournament title for the Samford women's soccer program, all three of which have come under coach Todd Yelton.

Bracket

Source:

Schedule

First Round

Quarterfinals

Semifinals

Final

Statistics

Goalscorers 
2 Goals
 Keyli Borman (Samford)
 Mary Raymond (Samford)

1 Goal
 Erin Bonner (Samford)
 Sierra Brewer (VMI)
 Cameryn Burke (Wofford)
 Allie Cardew (Wofford)
 Ally Fordham (Mercer)
 Alyssa Frazier (Samford)
 Kylie Gazza (Samford)
 Jasmine Green (Furman)
 Isabella Gutierrez (Furman)
 Faith Hauberg (Furman)
 Erin Houlihan (Furman)
 Osa Iyare (Chattanooga)
 Kate Manzione (The Citadel)
 Kyla Reynolds (Samford)
 Sophie Stewart-Hobbs (UNC Greensboro)
 Suzuka Yosue (The Citadel)

Own Goals
 Mercer vs. Samford

All-Tournament team

Source:

MVP in bold

See also 
 2019 Southern Conference Men's Soccer Tournament

References 

2019 Southern Conference women's soccer season
Southern Conference Women's Soccer Tournament